Karol Drzewiecki (born 1 November 1995) is a Polish professional tennis player.

Drzewiecki has a career-high Association of Tennis Professionals (ATP) singles ranking of 820, which he first achieved on 3 December 2018. He reached his career-high doubles ranking of 144 on 9 August 2021.

Drzewiecki has won 3 ATP Challenger doubles titles.

Tour titles

Doubles

External links
 
 

1995 births
Living people
Polish male tennis players
Sportspeople from Poznań
Sportspeople from Gorzów Wielkopolski
20th-century Polish people
21st-century Polish people